Estonia national ice hockey team may refer to:

 Estonia men's national ice hockey team
 Estonia men's national junior ice hockey team
 Estonia men's national under-18 ice hockey team
 Estonia women's national ice hockey team